was a town located in Mugi District, Gifu Prefecture, Japan.

As of 2003, the town had an estimated population of 4,038 and a density of 61.87 persons per km². The total area was 65.27 km².

On February 7, 2005, Mugi, along with the town of Mugegawa, and the villages of Horado, Itadori and Kaminoho (all from Mugi District), was merged into the expanded city of Seki.

Notes

External links
 Seki official website 

Dissolved municipalities of Gifu Prefecture
Populated places disestablished in 2005
Seki, Gifu

2005 disestablishments in Japan